Paštrić is a village situated in the Mionica municipality of Serbia.

References

Populated places in Kolubara District